Visakhapatnam International Airport  is a customs airport in Visakhapatnam, Andhra Pradesh, India. It also operates as a civil enclave on an Indian Navy airbase named INS Dega. It lies between the city localities of NAD X Road and Gajuwaka. The airport covers an area of 350 acres. The airport has experienced significant growth since the beginning of the 21st century, with the construction of a new terminal and runway and the commencing of international flights. The airport covers an area of 350 acres.

History 

In 1981, the airport commenced civilian operations with one flight per day. Used initially only for military operations, the ILS became operational for commercial aircraft from 30 March 2008. A new terminal building was inaugurated on 20 February 2009 and became operational on 27 March that year.

On 17 November 2011, the ICAO airport code was changed from VEVZ to VOVZ.

In September 2022, the Andhra Pradesh Airports Development Corporation Limited (APADCL) and Indian Navy officials have signed a MOU in New Delhi to move the civilian operations of Visakhapatnam Airport to the new Bhogapuram facility. The existing Visakhapatnam Airport is spread across 300 acres, out of which 170 acres will be handed over to the Indian Navy and the remaining 130 acres to Airport Authority of India (AAI) as per the MOU rules.

Facilities

Structure
The passenger terminal can handle 700 arriving and 1300 departing passengers. It covers an area of 31,400 square meters. The airport has a total of 18 parking bays.

Runways
The airport has two runways.
 Runway 10/28: , ILS CAT-1 equipped in Runway 28.
 Runway 05/23:

Terminals
The passenger terminal was opened in 2009 and can handle 2 million passengers per annum. After seeing greater number of footfall, AAI started upgrading present terminal on either sides adding 10000 sqm to existing structure, making total area to 31000 sqm. The terminal has 20 check-in counters which include 11 immigration and nine customs counters. The terminal has three aerobridges. Also there are plans to increase new services, checkin counters, immigration counters, parking bays to present terminal.

Also new n5 taxi track was opened in terminal to increase flight movements per hour to 15.

Airlines and destinations

Statistics

INS Dega naval base

The Indian Navy started aviation operations in Visakhapatnam in the late 1970s, with the construction of four helipads adjacent to the civil airfield. The airport at Visakhapatnam was transferred to the Directorate General of Civil Aviation in 1981. Additional hangars, maintenance facilities, and an operations complex were constructed soon after. The air station was called "Naval Air Station, Visakhapatnam".

On 21 October 1991, the air station was renamed and formally commissioned as INS Dega. The base has two aprons and is home to several squadrons: INAS 311, INAS 321, INAS 333, and INAS 350.

See also
 Bhogapuram Airport
 Vijayawada Airport

References

External links

Airports in Andhra Pradesh
Transport in Visakhapatnam
Buildings and structures in Visakhapatnam
World War II sites in India
Uttarandhra
1981 establishments in Andhra Pradesh
International airports in India